Chak No. 90/M.L. is a village located in Karor Lal Easan Tehsil, Layyah District, in the province of Punjab, Pakistan. It possesses fertile land on the bank of the Thal canal built by the British Indian Government during the decade 1940 and construction was completed at the end of this decade. This land was barren and sandy in the Thal desert before there came ancestors from Hoshiarpur District now located in Indian Punjab during the partition of Indo-PaK and they used the irrigation water from Thal Canal to irrigate their fields. Initially, the land was very fertile in patches where Sugarcane, cotton, and wheat were grown successfully and contributed to the country's economy. Some areas are consists of sand dunes where in Rabi season Gram crop is grown successfully. One of the major portions of Gram yield is produced from the Thal desert. With the passage of time schools, roads, and lined watercourses were developed by Government. A high school for boys was constructed in 1976 while a high school and college for Girls were built later on. 
Now, the village has a Basic health unit, Post Office, Veterinary Hospital, and Office of Union Council. 
It has a population of approximately 3600 who are 70% educated. It has 1500 registered votes.
There are also private schools that are working efficiently and providing education to the new generations of this area.
The Educational institutes include;
Sir Sayyed Public High School
Government secondary boys school
Government secondary girl's school
Government degree college for women

Villages in Layyah District